Shigekazu (written: 盛一 or 重和) is a masculine Japanese given name. Notable people with the name include:

August S. Narumi, Bronze Wolf recipient
, Japanese footballer and manager
, Japanese sprinter
, Imperial Japanese Navy admiral and naval aviator

Japanese masculine given names